is a Japanese television personality and former pop singer. She was formerly the leader of the Hello! Project group Juice=Juice. Her fruit in the group was peach.

Miyazaki is represented by Up-Front Promotion.

Biography
From June to August 2011, Miyazaki auditioned for both the S/mileage Member Boshū and the Morning Musume Genki Jirushi, but both auditions were rejected.
Miyazaki won the "Encouragement/Samantha Thavasa Award" in the 2nd Forest Award New Face Audition in March 2012. During the audition, she played a piano cover of Ai Otsuka's "Planetarium". After winning the award, Miyazaki received piano lessons in Tokyo every two weeks, and found out that she would debut in May.
In October 2012, Miyazaki participated in the planning of the television series Hello! Satoyama Life. Miyazaki debuted as a member of the "Satoyama movement" group Green Fields. The group had performed at Morning Musume's concert on the 28th of the same month. This was Miyazaki's first stage performance.
It was announced that Miyazaki and five Hello Pro Kenshusei members formed a new group on 3 February 2013. On 25 February, the group's name was revealed to be Juice=Juice. Miyazaki is the oldest member of the group.
On 13 June 2013 Miyazaki became the leader of Juice=Juice.
On December 21, Miyazaki announced that she would graduate from Juice=Juice and Hello! Project at the end of Juice=Juice's 2019 spring tour.

Works

Singles
Green Fields

Videos

Filmography

TV series

Radio

Publications

Photobooks

Notes

References

External links
 

1994 births
Living people
Japanese idols
Japanese television personalities
Japanese women pop singers
English-language singers from Japan
Juice=Juice members
Musicians from Ishikawa Prefecture